Raidix (stylized RAIDIX) is a Swiss-based private company that sells software products for professional SAN and NAS storage systems. RAIDIX supports InfiniBand, iSCSI and FibreChannel interfaces and transforms the standard x64 server hardware into a storage solution.

Raidix was founded in 2009.

References

External links 

Software companies of Switzerland
Computer storage companies
Swiss companies established in 2009